Mashhad-e Kaveh (also Romanized as Mashhad-e Kāveh and Mashhad Kāveh; also known as Mashhad) is a village in Kaveh Ahangar Rural District, in the Central District of Chadegan County, Isfahan Province, Iran. At the 2006 census, its population was 2,822, in 658 families.

Kaveh the Blacksmith 
The Iranian hero and the myth Kaveh the Blacksmith is believed to originate from Mashhad-e Kaveh. It is believed he was born on January 12 some 5000 years ago. His birth certificate at his grave in Mashhad e Kaveh, is a poem from the Safavid dynasty era, indicating Kaveh’s birthday is two months and a week before the Nowrooz night, thus it must be January 12. His birthday is a celebration day for friendship and justice.

References 

Populated places in Chadegan County